Sophie Alexander (born Sophie Alexander Katz on May 20, 1978, in Mexico City, Mexico) is a Mexican actress.

Filmography

Theater 
 Rock n' Roll
 Mujeres soñaron caballos
 Satélite 2012
 La modestia
 Parking Place del deseo
 Festen
 El oeste solitario
 Cuentos de Navidad
 De-madres
 Las mujeres sabias
 La gaviota
 Tres hermanas
 Hamlet
 El Filosofo Declara
 Homero, Iliada

Awards and nominations

References

External links

Sophie Alexander at the esmas.com

1978 births
Living people
Mexican telenovela actresses
Mexican television actresses
Mexican film actresses
Mexican stage actresses
Actresses from Mexico City
21st-century Mexican actresses